The Persian embassy to Siam (1685) was a diplomatic mission sent by the Safavid Empire under Suleiman I to the Ayutthaya Kingdom under the rule of Narai in the year 1685.

The details of this mission can be found in the book Safine-ye Solaymani, which was written by one of the members of the delegation named Mohammad Rabi ibn Mohammad Ebrahim.

See also 

 Iran–Thailand relations

References 

Iran–Thailand relations
Diplomatic missions of Safavid Iran
Foreign relations of the Ayutthaya Kingdom